Annibale Cattaneo (died 1584) was a Roman Catholic prelate who served as Bishop of Telese o Cerreto Sannita (1578–1584).

Biography
On 15 October 1578, Annibale Cattaneo was appointed during the papacy of Pope Gregory XIII as Bishop of Telese o Cerreto Sannita.
He served as Bishop of Telese o Cerreto Sannita until his death in 1584.

References

External links and additional sources
 (Chronology of Bishops) 
 (Chronology of Bishops) 

16th-century Italian Roman Catholic bishops
Bishops appointed by Pope Gregory XIII
1584 deaths